The Central Energy Trust Wildbase Recovery centre is a rehabilitation facility for injured wildlife with a visitor centre where the public can watch birds and other animals recovering from treatment. The  complex is situated at Victoria Esplanade in Palmerston North and is owned by the Palmerston North city council and co-managed with Massey University's veterinary school.

The centre was built in 2018 to provide facilities for the Massey University Wildbase team to looks after birds and other wildlife recovering after treatment at Massey University's Wildbase hospital and includes an education centre, rehabilitation aviaries and a walk-in aviary accessible for visitors since its opening to the public in February 2019. A team of volunteers provides educational information and public tours.

Although Wildbase Recovery's main purpose is to treat injured wildlife, oversee their recovery and get them back into the natural environment rather than permanently house animals like a zoo, the centre has been popular with the public, having had more than 100,000 visitors in its first year.

References

External links

Wildlife rehabilitation and conservation centers
Tourist attractions in Manawatū-Whanganui